The parliamentary groups of the Parliament of Catalonia are groups of deputies in the Parliament of Catalonia organized by political party or by coalition of parties. Their function is both political and administrative. The deputies in a group are expected to cooperate in promoting the policies of the group, while the group is allocated offices and technical support by the Board of Parliament, and may hire additional support for its members at its own expense (or that of its parent party).

At least five deputies are required to form a parliamentary group, who must all come from the same party or electoral coalition and must not all have been elected in the same constituency. Only one parliamentary group may be formed per party or coalition. Deputies who cannot join a normal parliamentary group—for example, because they have left their party, or because their party does not have at least five deputies in at least two constituencies—are organized into the "mixed group" (Catalan: Grup Mixt) for administrative purposes.

Each parliamentary group designates a spokesperson to represent the group in general matters. The Committee of Spokespersons regroups these representatives along with the president of Parliament and one of the Secretaries of the Board of Parliament to decide certain questions of a more or less technical nature, such as the designation of the appropriate committee to 
consider a proposed piece of legislation.

As of 2006, the Parliament with the 135 deputies elected in the 2006 election had six parliamentary groups: Convergence and Union grouping both CDC and UDC (48 seats), Socialists' Party of Catalonia-CpC (37 seats), Republican Left of Catalonia (21 seats), People's Party (14 seats), Initiative for Catalonia Greens-United and Alternative Left (12 seats) and the mixed group having only members of Citizens–Party of the Citizenry (3 seats).

References 

Parliament of Catalonia